Vladimir Leonidovich Baryshev (born 10 January 1960) is a Russian professional football coach and a former player.

Career
He made his professional debut in the Soviet Second League in 1977 for FC Turbina Naberezhnye Chelny. He played 6 games in the UEFA Intertoto Cup 1996 for FC KAMAZ-Chally Naberezhnye Chelny.

References

1960 births
People from Tatarstan
Living people
Soviet footballers
Russian footballers
Russian Premier League players
FC Rubin Kazan players
FC KAMAZ Naberezhnye Chelny players
Russian football managers
Sportspeople from Tatarstan
Association football midfielders
FC Neftekhimik Nizhnekamsk players